The Celadon Slope Garden, also known as Hays Station, in Payette National Forest in Idaho County, Idaho in the vicinity of Warren, Idaho, was listed on the National Register of Historic Places in 1990.

It consists of the remains of more than 30 terraces, an irrigation ditch, a root cellar, three rock cairns, and scattered artifacts of Chinese origin.

References

National Register of Historic Places in Idaho
Idaho County, Idaho
Chinese-American culture in Idaho